The John and Philomena Sand Zimmerer House is a historic house in Seward, Nebraska. It was built in 1919 for John Zimmerer, the owner of a hardware store, president of the First National Bank of Seward, and co-founder of the  Seward Equitable Savings and Loan Association. It was designed in the Jacobean Revival architectural style. It has been listed on the National Register of Historic Places since February 25, 1993.

References

		
National Register of Historic Places in Seward County, Nebraska
Houses completed in 1919
Jacobean architecture in the United States